Aleksander Kärner (8 February 1880 Maasi Parish (now Saaremaa Parish), Kreis Ösel – 9 March 1942 Perm Oblast, Russian SFSR) was an Estonian politician. He was a member of II Riigikogu.

References

1880 births
1942 deaths
people from Saaremaa Parish
People from Kreis Ösel
Estonian Social Democratic Workers' Party politicians
Estonian Socialist Workers' Party politicians
Members of the Riigikogu, 1923–1926
Members of the Riigikogu, 1926–1929
Members of the Riigikogu, 1929–1932
Members of the Riigikogu, 1932–1934
Estonian people who died in Soviet detention